Seda Noorlander and Christína Papadáki were the defending champions, but Papadáki did not compete this year after retiring from professional tennis in 1999. Noorlander teamed up with Giana Gutiérrez and lost in quarterfinals to Rosa María Andrés Rodríguez and Conchita Martínez Granados.

Laura Montalvo and Paola Suárez won the title by defeating Rita Kuti-Kis and Petra Mandula 6–4, 6–2 in the final.

Seeds

Draw

Draw

References
 Official results archive (ITF)
 Official results archive (WTA)

Copa Colsanitas - Doubles
2000 Doubles